In philately, a gutter is the space left between postage stamps which allows them to be separated or perforated. When stamps are printed on large sheets of paper that will be guillotined into smaller sheets along the gutter it will not exist on the finished sheet of stamps. Some sheets are specifically designed where two panes of stamps are separated by a gutter still in the finished sheet and gutters may, or may not, have some printing in the gutter. Since perforation of a particular width of stamps is normal, the gutter between the stamps is often the same size as the postage stamp.

Several derivative terms exist:

Gutter pairs are two stamps separated by a gutter.
Gutter block is a block of at least four stamps where either the vertical or horizontal pairs, or both, are separated by a gutter.
Gutter margin is a margin dividing a sheet of stamps into separate panes.

See also
 Centro de hoja (center of the sheet) with intersecting gutters
 Label (philately)

References

External links
 Chess Gutter Pairs and Blocks printer gutters
 Farley's Follies
 USA 3c violet Peace of 1783 gutter pair

Philatelic terminology